The Gray Nun of Belgium was a 1915 film announced for release on the Alliance Program by Dramatic Feature Films, Frank Joslyn Baum's short-lived successor to The Oz Film Manufacturing Company.

Despite the advertising in Motion Picture News announcing its release date, Katharine Rogers, in L. Frank Baum:  Creator of Oz, believes that Alliance found the film inferior and refused to distribute it.  The exhibition copy, which may have been a work print, may have been the only copy ever struck.  Baum himself thought that exchanges and exhibitors dismissed the film "rather arbitrarily" based on the Oz Company name.

In the film, Betty Pierce played a Mother Superior who aided Allied soldiers during World War I. Cathrine Countiss played the title role.  It also starred David Proctor, Mae Wells, Katherine Griffith, Raymond Russell, Robert Dunbar, Harry Clements, and James Spencer. Wells and Russell were prominent actors in the Oz Company, having played roles such as Mombi and Dr. Pipt, respectively.

References

Richard Mills and David L. Greene.  "The Oz Film Manufacturing Company."  The Baum Bugle. Autumn 1973.
Katharine M. Rogers.  L. Frank Baum:  Creator of Oz.  HarperCollins, 2004.

External links 
 

Lost American films
Western Front (World War I) films
Films set in Belgium
Belgium in fiction
1915 films
American silent feature films
American black-and-white films
1910s American films